Marton Paul Csokas (born 30 June 1966) is a New Zealand actor of film, stage, and television. A graduate of the Toi Whakaari drama school, he has worked extensively in Australia and Hollywood, along with his native country, and often portrays villainous roles.

His notable roles include Celeborn in the Lord of the Rings trilogy (2001-2003), Yorgi in XXX (2002), Guy de Lusignan in Kingdom of Heaven (2005), Trevor Goodchild in Æon Flux (2005), Hora in Romulus, My Father (2007), Nico in Dead Europe (2012), Jack Barts in Abraham Lincoln: Vampire Hunter (2012),  Nicolai Itchenko A.K.A. Teddy Rensen in The Equalizer (2014), and Quinn on the U.S. television series Into the Badlands. Earlier in his career, he played Leonard Dodds on the New Zealand soap opera Shortland Street.

Csokas is a three-time AACTA Award nominee, winning Best Actor in a Supporting Role for his performance in Romulus My Father. He was also nominated for Best Male Actor in a Play at the 2008 Helpmann Awards, for his portrayal of George in Belvoir's revival of Who's Afraid of Virginia Woolf?

Early life
Csokas was born in Invercargill, the son of Margaret Christine (née Rayner), a nurse, and Márton Csókás I, who worked as a mechanical engineer for E. Hayes & Sons. His father was Hungarian and his mother had English, Irish, and Danish ancestry. Csokas graduated from Toi Whakaari: New Zealand Drama School in 1989 with a Diploma in Acting.

Career

Csokas made his acting debut in 1990 on the New Zealand drama series Shark in the Park, as Terry Mercer in the episode "Technical K.O.". He also portrayed Leonard Rossi-Dodds in the soap opera Shortland Street from 1993 until 1995. In 1996, he starred in the romantic drama film Broken English; and from 1997 to 2001, he had a recurring role on Xena: Warrior Princess, portraying the character Borias. Csokas also portrayed Lord Celeborn in The Lord of the Rings: The Fellowship of the Ring (2001) and The Lord of the Rings: The Return of the King (2003), Yorgi in XXX (2002), Mr. Smith in Kangaroo Jack (2003), Jarda in The Bourne Supremacy (2004), Trevor Goodchild in Æon Flux (2005), and Guy de Lusignan in Kingdom of Heaven (2005).

Csokas' stage credits include plays by Tom Stoppard and William Shakespeare in the 1990s in New Zealand, and Who's Afraid of Virginia Woolf? (2007) and Peribáñez (2006) with Company B in Australia.

In 2007, he portrayed Hora in the drama film Romulus, My Father, for which he won an AACTA Award for Best Actor in a Supporting Role and a Film Critics Circle of Australia Award for Best Supporting Actor. In 2012, he appeared in the drama film Dead Europe. For his role in Dead Europe, he was again nominated for an AACTA Award for Best Actor in a Supporting Role.

In 2013, Csokas co-starred in the crime-thriller Pawn with Forest Whitaker and Michael Chiklis, and portrayed Jimmy Laszlo in the DirecTV police drama Rogue, starring opposite Thandie Newton. In 2014, he had roles in the films Noah, The Amazing Spider-Man 2, and Sin City: A Dame to Kill For, and as Nicolai Itchenko in The Equalizer. Also in 2014, he starred as the superintendent in the Discovery Channel's scripted miniseries Klondike. Csokas then portrayed General Thomas Gage in History Channel's three-part miniseries Sons of Liberty in 2015.

In May 2015, Csokas joined the cast of AMC's martial arts drama  Into the Badlands, playing the role of Quinn, the most powerful baron in the badlands. The show was canceled in 2019 after three seasons. In 2016, he co-starred with Joel Edgerton and Ruth Negga in the Jeff Nichols-directed drama film Loving, and starred alongside Vera Farmiga in the comedy-drama Burn Your Maps. Csokas starred alongside Emilia Clarke in the supernatural thriller Voice from the Stone released in April 2017. He also starred in Mark Felt The Man Who Brought Down the White House with Liam Neeson. In 2021 Csokas appeared in Juniper with Charlotte Rampling and in the historical drama film The Last Duel directed by Ridley Scott.

Personal life 
Csokas holds dual New Zealand and Hungarian citizenship. From 2005 to 2009, he was in a romantic relationship with his Kingdom of Heaven co-star Eva Green.

Filmography

Film

Television

Video game

Awards and nominations

References

External links

 

1966 births
Living people
New Zealand male film actors
New Zealand male television actors
New Zealand male soap opera actors
New Zealand male video game actors
New Zealand male voice actors
New Zealand people of Hungarian descent
New Zealand people of English descent
New Zealand people of Danish descent
New Zealand people of Irish descent
People educated at King's College, Auckland
People from Invercargill
Toi Whakaari alumni
20th-century New Zealand male actors
21st-century New Zealand male actors
New Zealand expatriates in the United States
Citizens of Hungary through descent
New Zealand stage actors